David Burris (sometimes credited as Dave Burris or David Allen Burris) is an American filmmaker, television producer, writer and musician. He directed the feature film The World Made Straight (Millennium Entertainment) and the short film The Side of the Road, which he also wrote.  He was the executive producer on CBS's Survivor and a writer on the USA/SyFy series Good vs. Evil. As a musician, he was a founding member and songwriter for Sire/Warner recording artists Jolene and a recording and touring member of Mercury/Polygram recording artists The Veldt.

Background 

Burris was born in Durham, raised in Raleigh and educated in Chapel Hill, North Carolina. His father, Craven Allen Burris was the dean of Raleigh's Meredith College and traveled overseas often for academic programs. David accompanied him on these sojourns, spending considerable chunks of his childhood in London while also traveling across the UK and Europe. His mother, Jane Russell Burris, was a high school librarian and instilled in him a deep love of literature and storytelling from an early age.

Education 

Burris did a year of study at the University of Edinburgh but ultimately took his bachelor's degree from UNC–Chapel Hill and his master's degree from Wake Forest University. At UNC's student television station Burris formed a sketch comedy troupe with future filmmakers Peyton Reed and John Schultz, among others. They produced a series called The World of Fun that was heavily influenced by Monty Python's Flying Circus and Second City Television.

Career

Early film work in New York (1990-1995) 

Burris moved to New York after college where he worked on a number of films for such NY indie-film scene notables as Abel Ferrara, Jim Jarmusch, and Paul Auster. In 1992 he produced the short film Howard Black starring John C. Reilly, followed by The Side of the Road in 1994, starring Jared Harris and Stephen Gevedon.

Musical work (1992-2002) 

In 1992 Burris hooked up with childhood friends Danny and Daniel Chavis and Marvin Levy to join Mercury/Polygram recording artists and soulful, shoegaze innovators The Veldt for their major label debut Afrodisiac. This led to numerous tours of the country, most notably with British ethereal rock legends The Cocteau Twins. Burris left the band as a full-time member in 1995 but continues to perform with the band when called upon.

In 1996 Burris formed the atmospheric American rock band Jolene with first cousin John Crooke. After four albums and multiple tours of Europe, The United Kingdom and the US, the band has taken an "extended break" since playing a final show at the classic London venue The Borderline in 2002 – a fledgling iteration of the band Bloc Party opened the show. Jolene songs penned by Burris feature on the soundtracks of the films Election and A Simple Plan.

TV work - Los Angeles (1999-present) 

In 1999 Burris moved to Los Angeles and took a job writing on the SyFy/USA series Good vs. Evil with fellow Carolinians Jonas and Josh Pate.

Burris eventually moved on to the CBS blockbuster series Survivor where he began as a supervising producer before taking on the role of "Show Runner" as the program's Executive Producer. In his time there he created hundreds of hours of TV and filmed on location in dozens of countries around the world.

Film work (2013 – present) 

In 2013 Burris returned to the world of feature film. He directed and produced The World Made Straight, an adaptation of Ron Rash's award-winning novel of the same name. Burris' producing partners on the picture were fellow North Carolina natives Todd Labarowski of Dreambridge Films and Michael Wrenn (currently based in Sydney). Shot entirely on location in the mountains around Asheville, North Carolina, the film stars Jeremy Irvine, Noah Wyle, Minka Kelly, Adelaide Clemens, Steve Earle and Haley Joel Osment. It was released theatrically in 2015 by Millennium Entertainment.

The New York Times calls the World Made Straight "a coming-of-age story in which codes and vendettas loom larger than the outside world." The New York Post describes the film as "Southern noir with literary heft" and having "a neo-Faulknerian atmosphere of indelible sin in a story that rises above cliché..." The film's soundtrack features a score by NC psych-folk band Megafaun and songs from Ellie Goulding, The Frames, Algia Mae Hinton, Susan Cowsill, The Connells, Hotel Lights and others.

Burris is currently developing an adaptation of Nic Brown's novel Doubles and an original screenplay by Miles Ross, The Golden Rule.

References 

Year of birth missing (living people)
Living people
American filmmakers
American television producers
Writers from North Carolina
American male songwriters